.cf is the Internet country code top-level domain (ccTLD) for the Central African Republic. It is administered by the Central African Society of Telecommunications.

Dot CF, also known as Dot CrossFire, is an initiative of the Societe Centrafricaine de Telecommunications (SOCATEL, headquartered in Bangui) in partnership with Freenom (previously known as Freedom Registry).

The domain has been made available for registration free of charge on Freenom's website, regardless of whether the individual who registers the domain has any connection with the Central African Republic. Exceptions include "high value" domain names, which include trademark domain names for most Fortune 500 companies, and common dictionary terms. Potentially valuable domains which are fewer than 4 characters are also marked "High Value". The same applies to other domains offered via Freenom, such as .tk and .ml.

The .cf registry allows the creation of emoji domain names.

References

External links
 IANA .cf whois information
 dot cf  page
 Freenom, a registrar offering .cf registration

Computer-related introductions in 1996
Communications in the Central African Republic
Country code top-level domains

sv:Toppdomän#C